Ed Schrock (born 1943)  was a Nebraska state senator from Elm Creek, Nebraska, United States in the Nebraska Legislature and farmer. 

Personal life
Schrock was born on August 20, 1943 in Holdrege, Nebraska, and graduated from Holdrege High School in 1961 and Nebraska Wesleyan University with a B.A. in business administration in 1965.  He was a member of the U.S. National Guard from 1966 to 1972. He is a former member of Nebraska corn based organizations, and current member of both Holdrege and Superior chamber of commerce, farm based organizations and Holdrege United Methodist Church.

State legislature
Schrock was appointed to the legislature on Dec. 31, 1990 to represent the 39th  Nebraska legislative district to replace William E. Barrett who was elected to Congress.  He left office in 1993 because of redistricting and was then elected to the in 1994 to represent the 38th  Nebraska legislative district.  He was reelected in 1998 and 2002.  He sat on the Education committee, the Committee on Committees and was the chairperson of the Natural Resources committee. Because Nebraska voters passed Initiative Measure 415 in 2001 limiting state senators to two terms after 2001, he was unable to run for reelection.

See also
Nebraska Legislature

References
 
 

1943 births
Living people
Nebraska state senators
Nebraska Wesleyan University alumni
People from Holdrege, Nebraska
20th-century Methodists
21st-century Methodists
American United Methodists